Coto may refer to:

People
 Coto (surname)

Places

 Coto 47, a town in Panama near its border with Costa Rica, and the site of the 1921 Coto War
 Coto, Isabela, Puerto Rico, a barrio
 Coto, Peñuelas, Puerto Rico, a barrio
 Coto (Narcea), a parish in Cangas del Narcea, Asturias, Spain
 El Coto, a parish in Somiedo, Asturias, Spain

Languages
 Orejón language (also known as Coto language)
 Coixoma language (also known as Coto language)

Other uses
 Coto makassar, an Indonesian soup
 Coto Supermarkets, a supermarket chain in Argentina

See also
 
 Coto Coto Train, a touristic train service in Japan
 Cotto (disambiguation)
 Koto (disambiguation)